Road names in Singapore come under the purview of Street and Building Names Board of the Urban Redevelopment Authority. In 1967, the Advisory Committee on the Naming of Roads and Streets was formed to name roads in Singapore. The committee was eventually renamed the Street and Building Names Board (SBNB) in 2003. The secretariat role of SBNB was taken over by Urban Redevelopment Authority in 2010 and SBNB is under the Ministry of National Development of Singapore.

All public streets, including roads for vehicular traffic and pedestrian malls, as well as private roads that are non-gated are officially named. Roads that are shorter than 60 metres in length need not be named.

Road names are either in the English language or Malay language, even though many names could be derived from other languages such as Mandarin Chinese and Tamil due to the diverse cultures of the Singaporean society. All road names are also officially translated into Mandarin Chinese by the Ministry of Communications and Information (MCI).

It is common for a long stretch of road to have different names at different sections; such changes in names usually, but not necessarily, occur at major junctions, or when the road passes over a river or canal. It is also possible for roads that are not directly connected to bear the same name; such cases usually arise from urban redevelopment which divides these initially connected roads into two or more unlinked sections.

Road names in Singapore usually, but not always, have a generic element and a specific element, the former of which could assume two forms: noun (e.g. "Taman", "Hill") or adjective (e.g. "Lengkok", "Rise").

History

Under colonial rule
In colonial Singapore, road naming was conducted by the Municipal Commission the road naming process.  Official road names tended to follow several trends, with the majority of roads named after figures in the colony, either for commemorative purposes, or after the owners of the land or estates the roads were first laid out on. Many roads were also named after places in Malaya and Southeast Asia, to reflect Singapore's status as capital of the Straits Settlements and Malay States, while a small proportion of roads were named after landmarks or economic activities. In addition, roads in proximity to one another often received names that were similar or followed a common trend.

Roads in areas associated with specific ethnic groups also tended to receive names related to these ethnicities. This was initially done to demarcate the ethnic zones within the town area, but continued even after the racial makeup of the districts no longer reflected their specified ethnicity. Road naming trends also differed between Asian and European areas, with roads in European areas given names derived from places in England or which indicated the ideals of European colonists.

Besides the official names given by the colonial authorities, the Asian communities also had their own informal names for roads, which differed between ethnicities and dialect groups. These informal names mostly derived from landmarks along the roads, while others denoted the presence of certain economic activities or secret societies, and some were derived from descriptions of the roads or the area around the roads. The informal names were also imprecise, and differed from the official names in most cases.

Singapore post independence
After Singapore's independence in 1965, the government adopted new road-naming policies as part of its nation-building effort. A Street Naming Advisory Committee was appointed in February 1967 by the Minister of Finance, and priority was given to local names and Malay names, while names of prominent figures and British places and people were discouraged. Consequently, all roads in newly built residential areas were given Malay names, with Malay generic elements like "Jalan" and "Lorong" frequently used. Opposition from property developers and residents in residential areas, and a lack of available Malay terms for naming new streets put paid to the policy, which was amended in 1968 to discourage the use of Malay in favour of names that reflected Singapore’s multi-ethnic society. In addition, a proposal to use numerical naming was taken up in the late 1960s. This proposal was vetoed by the Finance Minister, but numerical naming was subsequently used in public housing estates in Singapore from the 1960s to the 1990s.

Besides the adoption of new road-naming policies, the Singapore government also set about making official road names, which had hitherto only been provided in the Latin script, more accessible to the non-English speaking Chinese population. To that end, a Committee on the Standardisation of Street Names in Chinese was formed to provide official Chinese translations for the names of all roads in Singapore between 1967 and 1970. Subsequently, in the 1980s, the government attempted to change all Chinese place and road names to follow the Hanyu Pinyin system. This aroused debate and opposition within the government and among the general public, with concerns raised over the historical significance of dialect names and the ease of understanding of Pinyin names. As a result, the government halted efforts to change names to Pinyin in 1987.

Types of road names

Roads names in Singapore typically fall under six categories:
road names with a prefix (generic element) followed by a specific element;
road names with a specific element followed by a suffix (generic element);
road names that include acronyms;
road names that consist only of a single word;
road names with the definite article "the" followed by a specific element; and
road names without any prefix or suffix (generic element).

Due to the differences in the grammatical structure, prefixes could either be in English or Malay, while suffixes are generally in English.

Malay-derived generic elements
Road names in Singapore do not utilise many Malay generic elements commonly found in neighbouring Malaysia, such as Lebuh ("street"), Tingkat ("terrace"), Cangkat ("rise"), Lebuhraya ("avenue", "highway" or "expressway"), etc. The generic element "Persiaran" ("drive") was used in the road "Persiaran Keliling" in Singapore, but this road has been renamed to "Circuit Road".

English-derived generic elements

Road names that include acronyms
There are several instances whereby the official road names include acronyms.

Examples include:

Road names that consist only of a single word
Road names in this category are extremely rare in Singapore. There are currently only four roads that bear single-word names:

Bishopsgate
Causeway
Piccadilly
Queensway

Road names with the definite article "the"
Road names in this category are extremely rare in Singapore. There are currently only three road names that include "the":

The Inglewood
The Knolls
The Oval

Road names without any generic element
There are currently only five road names that do not have any generic element:

Naming convention

Expressways
Expressways of Singapore are given official abbreviations for ease of identification. Abbreviations consist of three letters; the first two letters correspond to the first two syllables of the name, while the last letter is derived from the first letter of the last word.

The only exceptions to this rule are Kallang-Paya Lebar Expressway (KPE) and Marina Coastal Expressway (MCE). "KPE" allows for both locations, Kallang and Paya Lebar, to be represented. "MCE" is selected to highlight the expressway's close proximity to the coast.

Names of expressways always appear in their abbreviated forms on road signs.

Road names in residential towns
Unlike other cities, it is very common for Singaporean roads to have derivative names (i.e. roads sharing the same specific element while differing only in their generic element). Many locations in Singapore, especially residential towns, follow this naming format. Certain generic elements are used only for a specific purpose, such as "Central" which is often reserved for roads that are located within town centres.

Road names in mature residential towns and estates (for example, Ang Mo Kio and Tampines) generally follow a numerical scheme. Those that do not are mostly non-mature towns (for example, Sengkang and Punggol) and locations where residential precincts are not concentrated or clustered (for example, Kallang and Marine Parade).

Generic elements reserved for specific roads
While suffixes like "Drive" and "Street" may be used interchangeably in most cases, some generic terms tend to only be used on roads that fulfil a certain criteria.

Road name modifiers
In certain scenarios whereby two or more roads are similarly named, modifiers are used to differentiate between these roads for easier identification. One reason for the existence of these similarly-named roads is urban redevelopment which turned previously singular roads into distinct, unconnected sections, effectively turning them into different roads altogether.

The following are modifiers used in Singapore road names to differentiate between similarly-named roads:

Common Malay terms in road names
The following are common Malay-derived terms found in Singapore road names (excluding those listed as "generic elements" above):

References

Bibliography

External links
 Perono Cacciafoco, Francesco, and Shu Qi Tuang. 2018. "Voices from the Streets: Trends in Naming Practices of Singapore Odonymy". Review of Historical Geography and Toponomastics, XIII, 25-26. pp. 9-30.

 Names